Jerzy Kowalski may refer to:
 Jerzy Kowalski (athlete), Polish sprinter
 Jerzy Kowalski (rower), Polish rower
 Jerzy Adam Kowalski, Polish researcher and popular science author